Mohamed Moselhy محمد مصيلحي (born ) is the head coach of El-Ahly Volleyball team. he was a former Egyptian male volleyball player at El-Ahly for 20 years. He was included in the Egypt men's national volleyball team that finished 11th at the 2000 Summer Olympics in Sydney, Australia. His brother, Hany Mouselhy, was also part of the national volleyball team at the 2000 Summer Olympics.

As a player 
 Mohamed Moselhy began playing Volleyball in 1986 at "14 years old" in El-Ahly.
 He began playing with the first squad at El-Ahly, in 1989. He played 20 years with El-Ahly .
 From 1987-93 he was included in the Egyptian national youth team.
 He was the captain of the team until 2006.
 Moselhy played more than 350 international matches.

Trophies and awards  
 Best Setter in Africa 1995
 Best Receiver in Africa 1997
 Best Player in Egypt 1999
 Best Arabian Server 2001
 Best Receiver in Egypt 2001

See also
 Egypt at the 2000 Summer Olympics

References

External links
 profile at sports-reference.com

1972 births
Living people
Egyptian volleyball coaches
Egyptian men's volleyball players
Place of birth missing (living people)
Volleyball players at the 2000 Summer Olympics
Olympic volleyball players of Egypt